The Trail Rider is a 1925 American silent Western film directed by W. S. Van Dyke and starring Buck Jones. Based on the 1924 novel The Trail Rider: A Romance of the Kansas Range by George Washington Ogden, the film is about a trail rider hired to protect ranchers from the actions of a corrupt banker. The film was produced by Fox Film Corp. and was released on February 22, 1925, in the United States. It marked Gary Cooper’s film debut as a stunt rider. It is not known whether the film currently survives.

Plot
Tex Hartwell (Buck Jones) rescues an old cobbler from the physical assault of corrupt banker Jim Mackey (Carl Stockdale). When Mackey orders his hired guns to kill Tex, the stranger outdraws them. Rancher Dee Winch (Jack McDonald) is impressed with Tex's fast draw and hires him as a trail rider, tasked with keeping diseased cattle off of his land.

Sometime later, Mackey's men stampede a herd of infected cattle onto Winch's land. When Winch learns of the infected cattle, he fires Tex, who leaves in disgrace. Meanwhile, Tex learns from Fanny Goodnight (Lucy Fox) that Mackey was behind the stampede of infected cattle. Tex confronts the corrupt banker and forces him to sign a confession admitting to his guilt. Later, the old cobbler kills Mackey, Tex's reputation is restored with the cattlemen, and he and Fanny ride trail together on their own.

Cast
 Buck Jones as Tex Hartwell
 Nancy Deaver as Sally McCoy
 Lucy Fox as Fanny Goodnight
 Carl Stockdale as Jim Mackey
 Jack McDonald as Dee Winch
 George Berrell as Uncle Boley
 Jack Rollens as Ollie, the barber
 Will Walling as Malcolm Duncan
 Silver the Horse
 Gary Cooper as A rider

Production
The Trail Rider is based on the 1924 novel, The Trail Rider: A Romance of the Kansas Range by George Washington Ogden (New York).

Release
The film was released in Austria as Steppenehre. It is not known whether the film currently survives.

References

External links
 
 
 

1925 films
1925 Western (genre) films
1925 lost films
American black-and-white films
Films directed by W. S. Van Dyke
Fox Film films
Lost American films
Lost Western (genre) films
Silent American Western (genre) films
1920s English-language films
1920s American films